Srđan Stanić may refer to:

 Srđan Stanić (footballer, born 1982), Serbian footballer
 Srđan Stanić (footballer, born 1989), Bosnian footballer